Alpesh Thakor is a politician from Gujarat, India. He is a member of the Gujarat Legislative Assembly from Gandhinagar South. He was earlier a member representing Radhanpur (2017–2019). Formerly associated with the Indian National Congress party, he joined Bharatiya Janata Party in 2019. He started his career as a social worker and political activist. He is a leader of the Koli community in Gujarat. He founded the Gujarat Kshatriya Thakor Sena as well as OBC, SC, ST Ekta Manch (OBC, SC, ST unity forum), a social platform to demand reservations for people of the respective communities, around which a movement took place in Gujarat shortly after the Patidar reservation agitation.

ALPESH

Gujarat Kshatriya Thakor Sena 
Thakor founded the Kshatriya Thakor Sena in 2011. He has led many movements for the rights of the Thakor community in Gujarat. In 2016, he floated a movement to rid the members of his community from liquor addiction. He has also demanded stricter laws against illegal trading of alcoholic drinks in Gujarat. The Kshatriya Thakor Sena has around 700,000 members as of October 2017. Rameshji Thakor, the former state vice-president of the Gujarat Kshatriya Thakor Sena, split from Alpesh Thakor to form his own outfit.  He formed the Royal Kshatriya Thakor Sena in 2013 and was elected as the president of his society.

OSS Ekta Manch 
Thakor comes from the Thakor community in Gujarat. He rose to prominence and media attention after he launched a movement to counter the Patidar reservation agitation by Hardik Patel. He founded the OSS (OBC, SC, ST) Ekta Manch to unite all people of these communities for demanding reservation according to population of the particular community. He also said that the hidden motive behind the Patidar agitations is nothing but a gameplan to scrape the reservation system, and that his movement will counter it to 'protect their constitutional right'. Thakor was arrested in September 2015 along with many others for organizing a meeting of all OBC communities in Mehsana district.

Politics 
On 23 October 2017, Thakor joined the Indian National Congress party. He contested and won from Radhanpur constituency in the 2017 Gujarat Legislative Assembly election. He had demanded the justice of a minor rape survivor in October 2018. The rape incident had triggered the attacks on the Hindi-speaking migrants in Gujarat later. On 9 April 2019 he quit the Indian National Congress and joined Bharatiya Janata Party on 18 July 2019. He contested legislative assembly bypoll from Radhanpur in October 2019 and lost by margin of 3500 votes. In the 2022 Gujarat Legislative Assembly election, he contested from Gandhinagar South and won by a margin of 43,064 votes.

Personal life 

He is married to Kiran, who is from a Trivedi Brahmin family.

References 

Koli people
1975 births
Living people
Political activists
Indian National Congress politicians from Gujarat
Activists from Gujarat
Gujarat MLAs 2017–2022
Bharatiya Janata Party politicians from Gujarat